Alberto da Costa e Silva (born 12 May 1931, in São Paulo) is a Brazilian historian, poet and former diplomat. He won the 2014 Camões Prize.

Diplomacy
He was ambassador of Brazil in Portugal from 1986 to 1990, in Colombia from 1990 to 1993 and in Paraguay from 1993 to 1995.

Works

History
A Enxada e a Lança: a África antes dos Portugueses 
A Manilha e o Libambo: a África e a Escravidão, de 1500 a 1700
Imagens da África (2013)

References

1931 births
Living people
Ambassadors of Brazil to Colombia
Ambassadors of Brazil to Paraguay
Ambassadors of Brazil to Portugal
Brazilian diplomats
20th-century Brazilian historians
Brazilian male poets
Writers from São Paulo
Camões Prize winners